Fine china most often refers to:
Porcelain

Fine china may also refer to:
 Fine China (band), an American indie rock band.
 "Fine China" (Chris Brown song)
 Fine China (Lana Del Rey song)
 Fine China (Klara Stenvall)
 "Fine China" (Future and Juice Wrld song)